Sri Rajagopala Swamy Temple, Bagavathapuram is a Hindu temple located in Kumbakonam, Thanjavur district, Tamil Nadu.

Other Temples 
 Sri Draupathy Amman Samedha Sri Dharmaraja Temple
 Sridevi Boodevi Samedha Vasudeva PerumalSri Mariamman Temple

References

Hindu temples in Thanjavur district